Dylan Kingwell (born July 6, 2004) is a Canadian actor. He is known for playing the roles of Duncan and Quigley Quagmire in the Netflix television series A Series of Unfortunate Events from 2017 to 2019. He is also known for having portrayed Steve Murphy and Evan Galico in the ABC drama series The Good Doctor. He portrayed Arthur Henderson in Hallmark's Campfire Kiss.

Career 
In 2011, Kingwell landed his first role in the comedy film To The Mat as Jordy Junior. Two years later, he appeared in the Franco-Canadian adventure film The Young and Prodigious T. S. Spivet and on the science fiction television series The Tomorrow People, aired on The CW. In 2014, he played young Coyle in the short-length film Soldiers of Earth. He also appeared in Tim Burton's Big Eyes the same year.

In 2015, he played a major role in the A&E series The Returned, an American adaptation of the French television series The Returned. Kingwell has also appeared in two Hallmark Christmas television films: Ice Sculpture Christmas as young David and The Christmas Note as Ethan. He also appeared in Wish Upon a Christmas as Danny, which aired on Lifetime. That same year, he played a young Sam Winchester in the CW series Supernatural.

In 2016, he played the character of Peyton Reddings in the television film The Wilding and also the character of Max Clark in the television thriller film A Stranger With My Kids. On September 23, 2016, he announced on his Instagram account that he would be part of the cast of the Netflix series A Series of Unfortunate Series, playing the Quagmire twins, Duncan and Quigley, initially appearing as recurring characters in the first season. Kingswell was promoted to the main cast for the series' second season. 

Starting in 2017, he appeared on ABC series The Good Doctor as Steve Murphy, title character Shaun Murphy's younger brother, who died in an accident before the events of the show.

In 2020, he played Luca on the science fiction television series The 100 in its seventh and final season. He also played the role of Sam Thomas in the series The Baby-Sitters Club.

In 2021, he played a young Clark Kent in the superhero drama television series Superman & Lois.

In 2022, he played Sam Price in the fantasy television series Ruby and the Well.

Filmography

References

External links 
 Official page
 

2004 births
21st-century Canadian male actors
Canadian male child actors
Canadian male film actors
Canadian male television actors
Living people
Male actors from Vancouver